Wehn may refer to:

People
 Henning Wehn (born 1974), German comedian

Places
 Wehn, Waldbröl, Germany
 Wehn Valley or Wehntal, Switzerland

Other
 WEHN or WEHM, American radio station